Anstruther is a Scottish town and surname.

Anstruther may also refer to:

People
Anstruther baronets
Clan Anstruther
Alexander Anstruther (1846–1902), Indian-born English cricketer
Philip Anstruther (British Army officer) (1682–1760), Scottish professional soldier and politician
Robert Anstruther (British Army officer) (1768–1809), Scottish general
Robert Anstruther (soldier) (  1550-1580), Scottish soldier in the service of Mary, Queen of Scots

Other uses
Mr. Anstruther, a P. G. Wodehouse character; see List of Jeeves characters
Anstruther railway station, a former station serving the town
Anstruther Township, a former township in Ontario, Canada, now part of North Kawartha Township